The red-veined darter or nomad (Sympetrum fonscolombii) is a dragonfly of the genus Sympetrum.

Taxonomy
There is genetic and behavioural evidence that S. fonscolombii is not closely related to the other members of the genus Sympetrum and it will at some time in the future be removed from this genus.

Etymology
Sympetrum fonscolombii was named under the protonym  Libellula fonscolombii  by the Belgian entomologist Edmond de Sélys Longchamps, in 1840, in honor of the French entomologist Étienne of Fonscolombe (hence the species name). Its name is sometimes spelt fonscolombei instead of fonscolombii but Askew (2004) gives the latter as the correct spelling.

Distribution
Sympetrum fonscolombii is a widespread and common species  in much of central and southern Europe including most Mediterranean islands, North Africa, the Middle East, Mongolia, south-western Asia, including the Indian Subcontinent, the Indian Ocean Islands and Sri Lanka. In Europe it is resident in the south of its range but in some years it migrates northward. From the 1990s onwards has increasingly been found in northwest Europe, including Belgium, Sweden, Finland, Poland, Britain and Ireland. It is the only Libellulidae to be found in the Azores and it is also found on the Canary Islands and Madeira.

Habitat
It breeds in a wide range of habitats including marshes, lakes, ponds, permanent and seasonal rivers. It is able to recolonize dry areas after a rainfall.

Identification
This species is similar to other Sympetrum species but a good view with binoculars should give a positive identification, especially with a male.

Males have a red abdomen, redder than many other Sympetrum species. The frons and the thorax are red-brown. The eyes are brown above and blue/grey below. The wings have red veins and the wing bases of the hind-wings are yellow. The pterostigma is pale yellow with a border of black veins.

Female are similar but the abdomen is ochre yellow, not red, with two black lines along each side. The wings have yellow veins at the costa, leading edge and base, not red veins as found in the males. The legs of both sexes are mostly black with some yellow.

Immature males are like females but often with more red and a single line along each side of the abdomen.

Male S. fonscolombii can be mistaken for Crocothemis erythraea as both are very red dragonflies with yellow bases to the wings, red veins and pale pterostigma. However C. erythraea has no black on the legs, a broader body and no black on the head. Also C. erythraea females do not oviposit in tandem. The gestalt image of these two species is different and with some experience are easy to tell apart.

Biology and behaviour
Sympetrum fonscolombii can be seen on the wing throughout the year around the Mediterranean and in the south of its range, however, its main flight period is May to October and it is scarce during the winter months. It is a territorial species with the males often sitting on an exposed perch.

After copulation the pair stay in tandem for egg laying and pairs can be seen over open water with the female dipping her abdomen into the water depositing eggs. Pairs are known to fly over the sea in tandem dipping into the salt water where the eggs soon perish. The eggs and larvae develop within a few months and S. fonscolombii unlike most other European dragonflies has more than one generation a year. Some larvae overwinter.

References

 Askew, R.R. (2004) The Dragonflies of Europe. (revised ed.) Harley Books.pp180 and 213 . 
 Boudot JP., et al. (2009) Atlas of the Odonata of the Mediterranean and North Africa. Libellula Supplement 9:1-256.
 Dijkstra, K-D.B & Lewington, R. (2006) Field Guide to the Dragonflies of Britain and Europe. British Wildlife Publishing. .

External links
African Dragonflies and Damselflies Online  Red-veined darter in Africa

Dragonflies of Europe
Libellulidae
Insects described in 1840